Brethren High School may refer to the following high schools:

Brethren Christian Junior/Senior High School in Huntington Beach, California
Brethren High School in Brethren, Michigan